The Pace That Kills (also known as Cocaine Madness and The Cocaine Fiends) is a 1935 American exploitation film directed by William O'Connor. The film, starring Lois January, tells the story of Jane Bradford, who gets involved with a drug dealer and becomes addicted to cocaine. Similar to other movies of the genre, the final film was a reissued work with additional scenes, mostly using footage from the earlier silent The Pace That Kills (1928).

Plot
Small-town girl Jane Bradford (Lois January) falls for Nick (Noel Madison), a guy from the big city who offers her the opportunity to escape her small-town life. He also offers her "headache powder" that she is unaware is really cocaine—and that Nick is a drug dealer. By the time they get to the city, she is hooked on her new medicine.

When Jane's family back home doesn't hear from her for a year, her brother Eddie (Dean Benton) comes to the city to look for her. He gets a job as a drive-in carhop and is befriended by waitress Fanny (Sheila Bromley). Fanny is one of Nick customers, and Fanny soon gets Eddie hooked on the "headache powder." This vice soon sends Eddie's and Fanny's lives downhill: they're both fired and unable to find new jobs. On the periphery of both Eddie and Jane's lives is Dorothy Farley (Lois Lindsay), a drive-in customer who dates Dan (Charles Delaney). She comes from a wealthy family, throws money around easily, and is willing to financially assist those in need.

Fanny tells Eddie that she is pregnant.  He tells her he really never loved her. She turns off the flame and lets the gas into the tenement.  The song "All I Want Is You" is sung at the nightclub.  Dorothy's father is exposed as a drug mobster and Jane, now known as Lil, shoots and kills Nick as the police arrive.  Dan was an undercover cop and he and Dorothy are to marry.

Cast

 Lois January as Jane Bradford aka Lil
 Noel Madison as Nick - The Pusher
 Sheila Bromley as Fanny
 Dean Benton as Eddie Bradford
 Lois Lindsay as Dorothy Farley
 Charles Delaney as Dan - the Detective - Dorothy's Boyfriend
 Eddie Phillips as Manager of Dead Rat Club
 Frank Shannon as Mr. Farley
 Fay Holden as Madame / Henchwoman
 Maury Peck as himself - Master of Ceremonies
 Nona Lee as herself - Vocalist
 Gay Sheridan as Dorothy's Friend
 Frank Collins as himself - Singing Waiter

Preservation status
A copy is preserved in the Library of Congress collection.

Production
Typical of the other films that Willis Kent produced during the 1920s, 1930s and 1940s was a string of low-budget westerns and exploitation films, thinly disguised as cautionary tales. The plot also dealt with amorality and prostitution. Production began November 9, 1935.

Soundtrack

 Nona Lee - "All I Want Is You"
 Frank Collins - "Towsee Mongalay" (Written by Grahame Jones)

Reception
The Pace That Kills was  released without a Code seal from the Motion Picture Producers and Distributors of America (MPPDA) and distributed via "State Rights" where local sales agents would then sell rights to individual theaters. The theater operators would then play the film as often as they desired in an attempt to make as much profit as possible. The Pace That Kills was re-issued in 1937 as The Cocaine Fiends.

Re-use of footage
Footage from the film, including the song "All I Want Is You," was re-used in Confessions of a Vice Baron (1943).

References

Notes

Bibliography

 Cripps, Thomas. Hollywood's High Noon: Moviemaking and Society Before Television. Baltimore, Maryland: The Johns Hopkins University Press, 1996. .
 Hall, Sheldon and Stephen Neale, Epics, Spectacles, and Blockbusters: A Hollywood History. Detroit, Michigan: Wayne State University Press, 2010. .

External links

 
 
 
 

1935 films
American social guidance and drug education films
American black-and-white films
1935 drama films
1930s exploitation films
American drama films
1930s English-language films
1930s American films